"Ray Charles" is a single released from American rap group Chiddy Bang. It was released in Canada on November 14, 2011 as a digital download as the second single from their debut studio album Breakfast. The song is a homage to the musician of the same name.

Music video
A music video to accompany the release of "Ray Charles" was first released onto YouTube on January 5, 2012. It was directed by Alan Ferguson. The music video features the duo watching videos on VEVO, including one that features the duo dressed up like Ray Charles. Briefly, "Pass Out" and "So What Cha Want", by Tinie Tempah and the Beastie Boys, respectively, can be heard. The scene in the church towards the end of the video is an homage to The Blues Brothers. After one and week of being on the site the official video had been viewed just over 3.8 million times.

Critical reception
Robert Copsey of Digital Spy gave the song a positive review stating:
It's easy to see how they've come to appreciate the late star as their soul homage not only fully embodies his sound, but also highlights how popular it remains today. Over a vintage piano riff and bouncy jazz section they rap a tribute to the legend that falls somewhere between profound and dangerously tongue-in-cheek ("You're too blind to see it"), but the result nonetheless sounds genuinely heartfelt.

Track listing
Digital Download
"Ray Charles" – 3:43

Charts

Release history

References

2011 singles
I.R.S. Records singles
Virgin Records singles
2011 songs
Song recordings produced by S*A*M and Sluggo
Songs written by Sam Hollander
Songs written by Dave Katz
Music videos directed by Alan Ferguson (director)